Rein van Duijnhoven (born 5 September 1967) is a former professional footballer who played goalkeeper.

Career
Van Duijnhoven was born in Veghel, Netherlands. During the 1995–96 season, he scored for MVV Maastricht in a game against FC Den Bosch. This goal was voted the season's Goal of the Season.

Van Duijnhoven played for Helmond Sport, Longa Tilburg, MVV Maastricht and VfL Bochum. In March 2004, he claimed a place in Bundesliga history after keeping a record 912 minutes of clean sheets beating the previous record held by Norbert Nigbur.

Retirement
As of 2017, van Duijnhoven is goalkeeper coach at Helmond Sport.

Career statistics

References

External links
 

1967 births
Living people
People from Veghel
Dutch footballers
Footballers from North Brabant
Association football goalkeepers
Helmond Sport players
Longa Tilburg players
MVV Maastricht players
VfL Bochum players
Eredivisie players
Eerste Divisie players
Bundesliga players
2. Bundesliga players
Dutch expatriate footballers
Dutch expatriate sportspeople in Germany
Expatriate footballers in Germany